Progress Glazov is an ice hockey team in Glazov, Russia. They play in the Junior Hockey League Division B, the second level of Russian junior ice hockey.

History
The club was founded in 1954 as Traktor Glazov. They changed their name to Torpedo Glazov in 1957, before taking on their current name, Progress Glazov, in 1962.

External links
 Official site

Ice hockey teams in Russia
Ice hockey clubs established in 1954
Sport in Udmurtia